Glyphipterix bergstraesserella is a moth of the  family Glyphipterigidae. It is found in most of Europe, except Ireland, Great Britain, the Netherlands, Portugal, most of the Balkan Peninsula and Ukraine.

The wingspan is 10–15 mm. Adults are on wing from May to July and in October.

The larvae feed on Luzula luzuloides. They bore the stem of their host plant.

References

External links
Lepiforum.de

Moths described in 1781
Glyphipterigidae
Moths of Europe